Woodburn Success Alternative High School, also known as Woodburn Success School, is a public alternative high school in Woodburn, Oregon, United States.

Academics
In 2008, 37% of the school's seniors received their high school diploma. Of 60 students, 22 graduated, 17 dropped out, and 21 are still in high school.

References

High schools in Marion County, Oregon
Woodburn, Oregon
Alternative schools in Oregon
Public high schools in Oregon